Grupo Cadena, formerly known as Cadena Baja California, was a media company based in Tijuana, Baja California, Mexico, with business offices in San Diego, California, United States. CBC had media properties located in Tijuana, Ensenada, Tecate and Mexicali.

History 
CBC, began in 1936 with the establishment of radio station XEBG-AM in Tijuana, followed in 1950 by XEDX-AM in Ensenada, XEMBC-AM in Mexicali in 1964, and XEWV-FM in 1974.

In 1990, CBC established its first television station, XHBJ-TV channel 45 in the city of Tijuana.

In 1994, XHMORE-FM began broadcasting; the station currently carries a Rock en Español format as "More FM 98.9", since September 2010. The More FM branding and format would later be carried over to XEWV-FM Mexicali on September 9, 2011.

Also part of the CBC family is XESPN-AM; formerly an affiliate of ESPN Radio, the station changed to a news/talk format as "Noticias 800" on November 1, 2010.

On January 24, 2011, CBC converted "CBC Radio" stations XEBG-AM, XEMBC-AM and Ensenada station XEDX-AM to a new news/talk format, under the "Cadena" branding. XESPN was later also rebranded as Cadena 800 AM.

In November 2019, XHBJ ceased to be a Televisa broadcaster and was renamed ¨45 TV Tijuana¨ with programming from Multimedios TV, XHILA-TDT Mexicali and news cuts from the ¨Cadena¨ news department. And a show from its sister station MORE FM 98/9.

In January 2020 XEWV-FM changed its format, from MORE FM to Suena FM with pop music in Spanish.

On May 22, 2022 Tijuana XESPN-AM 800 kHz XEBG-AM 1550 kHz XHMORE-FM 98.9 MHz & Mexicali XEMBC-AM 1190 kHz went off the air and its programming is online-only.

Stations 

Cadena also formerly owned XEMMM-AM in Mexicali, which began as XEWV-AM in 1955 and was acquired along with XEWV-FM in 1974. CBC sold XEMMM to Organización Editorial Mexicana's ABC Radio division in 2004.

References

External links 
 Official  Cadena Baja California website

Broadcasting companies of Mexico
Mass media in Tijuana
Companies based in Tijuana
Mass media companies established in 1936
Mexican companies established in 1936